Nicola Fusco (born August 14, 1956 in Napoli) is an Italian mathematician
mainly known for his contributions to the fields of calculus of variations, regularity theory of partial differential equations, and the theory of symmetrization. He is currently professor at the Università di Napoli "Federico II". Fusco also taught and conducted research at the Australian National University at Canberra, the Carnegie Mellon University at Pittsburgh and at the University of Florence.

He is the Managing Editor of the scientific journal Advances in Calculus of Variations, and member of the editorial boards of various scientific journals.

Awards
Fusco won the 1994 edition of the Caccioppoli Prize of the Italian Mathematical Union, and, in 2010, the Tartufari Prize from the Accademia Nazionale dei Lincei. In 2008 he was an invited speaker at European Congress of Mathematics and in 2010 he was invited speaker at the International Congress of Mathematicians on the topic of "Partial Differential Equations."

From 2010 he is a corresponding member of Accademia Nazionale dei Lincei.

Selected publications
Acerbi, E.; Fusco, N. "Semicontinuity problems in the Calculus of Variations" Archive for Rational Mechanics and Analysis 86 (1984)
Haïm Brezis; Fusco, N.; Sbordone, C. "Integrability for the Jacobian of orientation preserving mappings" Journal of Functional Analysis 115 (1993)
 Fusco, N.; Pierre-Louis Lions; Sbordone, C. "Sobolev imbedding theorems in borderline cases" Proceedings of the American Mathematical Society 124 (1996)
Luigi Ambrosio, L.; Fusco, N.; Pallara, D. "Partial regularity of free discontinuity sets"  Annali della Scuola Normale Superiore di Pisa Classe di Scienze (2) 24 (1997)
Ambrosio, L.; Fusco, N.; Pallara, D. Functions of bounded variation and free discontinuity problems. Oxford Mathematical Monographs. The Clarendon Press, Oxford University Press, New York (2000)
Irene Fonseca; Fusco, N.; Paolo Marcellini; "On the total variation of the Jacobian" Journal of Functional Analysis 207 (2004)
 Chlebik, M.; Cianchi, A.; Fusco, N. "The perimeter inequality under Steiner symmetrization: cases of equality"  Annals of Mathematics (2) 162 (2005)
 Fusco, N.; Maggi, F.; Pratelli, A. "The sharp quantitative isoperimetric inequality" Annals of Mathematics (2) 168 (2008)

References

External links
Site of Caccioppoli Prize

21st-century Italian mathematicians
Living people
20th-century Italian mathematicians
1956 births
Scientists from Naples
PDE theorists
Academic staff of the Australian National University
Academic staff of the University of Florence
Academic journal editors
Variational analysts
University of Naples Federico II alumni
Members of the Lincean Academy
European Research Council grantees